William Cordell (died 1395/96), of Bridport, Dorset was an English politician.

He was a Member (MP) of the Parliament of England for Bridport in September 1388.

References

Year of birth missing
1390s deaths
English MPs September 1388
14th-century English politicians
People from Bridport